Duck Creek is a stream in Brown and Outagamie counties, Wisconsin, in the United States.

Duck Creek was named for the many ducks seen along its banks by trappers. In the Menominee language, it is known as Sēqsepaketaheqkoneh, an archaic name meaning "duck landing place".

See also
List of rivers of Wisconsin

References

Rivers of Brown County, Wisconsin
Rivers of Outagamie County, Wisconsin
Rivers of Wisconsin